Eucalyptus educta is a spreading, twisted mallee that is endemic to Western Australia. It has reddish brown minni ritchi bark, more or less rounded to egg-shaped leaves, glaucous flower buds arranged in groups of seven, creamy white flowers and flattened hemispherical fruit.

Description
It has rough, reddish brown, minni richi bark and glaucous branchlets. Adult leaves are the same dull greyish green on both sides, more or less rounded to egg-shaped with the narrower end towards the base. Flowering occurs in March and April and the flowers are creamy white.

Taxonomy
Eucalyptus educta was first formally described in 1992 by the botanists Lawrence Alexander Sidney Johnson and Ken Hill in the journal Telopea from a specimen collected by Ian Brooker from hills known as "The Dromedaries" north of Beacon. The specific epithet (educta) is derived from the Latin word eductus meaning "drawn out", referring to the long operculum.

Distribution
This mallee has a limited range with two populations occurring on hills near Beacon where it grows in shallow soils among granite rocks. It has been recorded in the Coolgardie, Murchison, Swan Coastal Plain and Yalgoo biogeographic regions of Western Australia.

Conservation status
Eucalyptus educta is classified as "Priority Two" by the Western Australian Government Department of Parks and Wildlife meaning that it is poorly known and from only one or a few locations.

See also
List of Eucalyptus species

References

educta
Endemic flora of Western Australia
Mallees (habit)
Myrtales of Australia
Eucalypts of Western Australia
Endangered flora of Australia
Plants described in 1992
Taxa named by Lawrence Alexander Sidney Johnson
Taxa named by Ken Hill (botanist)